The 1988–89 season ended for First Vienna FC with a fifth-place finish in the domestic league. This qualified the club for the 1989–90 UEFA Cup and was their second and up to now last appearance in a European competition.

Squad

Squad and statistics

|-
! colspan="12" style="background:#dcdcdc; text-align:center;"| Goalkeepers

|-
! colspan="12" style="background:#dcdcdc; text-align:center;"| Defenders

|-
! colspan="12" style="background:#dcdcdc; text-align:center;"| Midfielders

|-
! colspan="12" style="background:#dcdcdc; text-align:center;"| Forwards

|}

References

Vienna
First Vienna FC seasons